Dolichoropica unicolor is a species of beetle in the family Cerambycidae, and the only species in the genus Dolichoropica. It was described by Breuning in 1970.

References

Apomecynini
Beetles described in 1970
Monotypic Cerambycidae genera